Germany men's national goalball team is the men's national team of Germany.  Goalball is a team sport designed specifically for athletes with a vision impairment.  It takes part in international competitions.

Paralympic Games

1976 Toronto 

The 1976 Summer Paralympics were held in Toronto, Canada.  The team was one of seven men's teams participating, and they finished second overall.

1980 Arnhem 

The team competed in the 1980 Summer Paralympics in Arnhem, Netherlands, where twelvemen's teams took part.  The team finished first.

1984 New York 

The team competed in the 1984 Summer Paralympics at Long Island, New York City, United States of America, where thirteen men's and five women's teams participated.  The team finished sixth.

2020 Tokyo 
 

The team competed in the 2020 Summer Paralympics, with competition from Wednesday 25 August to finals on Friday 3 September 2021, in the Makuhari Messe arena, Chiba, Tokyo, Japan.  

Round-robin

World Championships  

IBSA World Goalball Championships have been held every four years from 1978.  Placing first or second in the tournament may earn a berth in the Paralympic Games goalball tournaments.

2022 Matosinhos 

The team competed in the 2022 World Championships from 7 to 16 December 2022, at the Centro de Desportos e Congressos de Matosinhos, Portugal.  There were sixteen men's and sixteen women's teams.  They placed fourth in Pool C, and seventh in final standings.

Regional championships 

The team competes in the IBSA Europe goalball region.  Groups A and C are held one year, and Group B the following year.  Strong teams move towards Group A.

See also 

 Disabled sports 
 Germany at the Paralympics

References

Goalball men's
National men's goalball teams
Germany at the Paralympics
Goalball in Germany
European national goalball teams